Mordellistena paradohumeralis is a species of beetle in the genus Mordellistena of the family Mordellidae. It was described by Ermisch in 1963 and is endemic to Cyprus.

References

Beetles described in 1963
paradohumeralis
Beetles of Europe
Endemic arthropods of Cyprus